Altantsy (Altan) is a rural locality (a selo), the only inhabited locality, and the administrative center of Altansky Rural Okrug in Amginsky District of the Sakha Republic, Russia, located  from Amga, the administrative center of the district. Its population as of the 2010 Census was 814, down from 979 recorded during the 2002 Census.

References

Notes

Sources
Official website of the Sakha Republic. Registry of the Administrative-Territorial Divisions of the Sakha Republic. Amginsky District. 

Rural localities in Amginsky District